Austrolimulidae is an extinct family of horseshoe crabs belonging to the infraorder Limulina. Members of the family are known from the Permian to the beginning of the Jurassic, though one species has been reported from the end of the Cretaceous. Austrolimulids are known for amongst the most extreme morphologies among Xiphosurids, including large elongated genal spines. Unlike living Limulids, Austrolimulids were likely adapted for freshwater and brackish environments. They are considered to be the sister group to Limulidae, the group that contains all modern horseshoe crabs.

Genera 

 †Austrolimulus Riek, 1955 Triassic, Beacon Hill Shale, NSW, Australia
 †Attenborolimulus Bicknell, 2021 Triassic (Olenekian), Petropavlovka Formation, Cis-Urals, Russia
 †Batracholimulus Wilde, 1987 Triassic (Rhaetian), Exter Formation, Germany
 †Boeotiaspis Lamsdell, 2020 Carboniferous, United States (Jr. synonym)
 †Casterolimulus Holland, Erickson & O'Brien, 1975 Late Cretaceous (Maastrichtian) Fox Hills Formation, North Dakota, USA (Inconsistently placed in this family)
 †Dubbolimulus Pickett 1984 Middle Triassic (Anisian) Napperby Formation, Australia
†Franconiolimulus Bicknell, Hecker & Heyng, 2021 Early Jurassic (Hettangian) , Germany
 †Limulitella Schimper 1853 Middle Triassic (Anisian), Grés á Voltzia Formation, France
 †Panduralimulus Allen and Feldmann 2005 Early Permian (Kungurian),  Lueders Formation, Texas, USA
 †Psammolimulus Lange 1923 Early-Middle Triassic, Solling Formation, Germany
 †Tasmaniolimulus Bicknell, 2019 Early Triassic, Jackey Shale, Tasmania, Australia
 †Vaderlimulus Lerner, Lucas and Lockley, 2017 Early Triassic (Olenekian) Thaynes Group, Idaho, USA

References

Xiphosura